Nothing Lasts... But Nothing is Lost is a 2005 album by Shpongle. It is the project's third and was announced as their last, though that plan later changed.  Like the previous two albums, it features many live musicians and vocalists in combination with computer-generated sounds and spoken-word samples.  Stylistically the album can be described as a fusion of world music, intelligent dance music, and psychedelic trance.  It is dedicated in memory of author and psychedelic researcher Terence McKenna, whose voice and ideas are used throughout the album. The tracks flow together continuously without any break.

According to Simon Posford, the album actually has 8 songs divided into 20 tracks. Each part symbolizes a phase in the dream sequence. The vinyl version of the album is separated into these 8 tracks, but the track listing is identical to that of the digital and CD versions.

Track listing

All tracks written by Simon Posford and Raja Ram, except track 19 (S. Posford, R. Ram, P. Callard) and track 20 (P. Callard).

Credits

In The Studio
 Simon Posford: drums (tracks 1, 2, 7, 8, 18, 19), bass guitar (tracks 4, 9), electric guitar (tracks 9, 10, 18, 19), synthesizer, keyboards, drum programming, production
 Raja Ram: flute (tracks 7, 13, 15, 17, 19), vocals (tracks 2, 7, 8, 11-13, 19)
 Pete Callard: acoustic guitar (tracks 1-3, 18-20), electric guitar (tracks 18, 19)
 Hari-Om: vocals (tracks 9, 10, 14, 15)
 Chris Barker: bass (tracks 3, 7, 16)
 Ott: timbales (tracks 3, 5)
 Kevin Metcalfe: mastering at Soundmasters

Shpongle Live
 Pete Callard: guitars
 Hari-Om: vocals
 Michele Adamson: vocals
 Nogira: drums, percussion
 Harry Escott: cello
 Raja Ram: flute, vocal effects
 Simon Posford: computers, bass, mixing
 Ott: engineering

Samples and allusions
 Botanical Dimensions samples from the Richard Linklater film Waking Life.
 Levitation Nation samples a 2003 song by the Brazilian samba school Beija-Flor de Nilópolis.
 The title for Nothing Lasts comes from Ovid's Metamorphoses, a translation of "Omnia mutantur, sed nihil interit"
 Circuits of the Imagination contains a sample of the "bionic" sound effect from The Six Million Dollar Man.
 The Nebbish Route song samples Ned Flanders from The Simpsons episode El Viaje Misterioso de Nuestro Jomer (The Mysterious Voyage of Homer).

References

External links 
 Official Shpongle Website

2005 albums
Shpongle albums

he:Nothing Lasts...But Nothing Is Lost